Cheshmeh Murineh (also Romanized as Cheshmeh Mūrīneh; also known as Kolah Shak Mīrzā) is a village in Cheleh Rural District, in the Central District of Gilan-e Gharb County, Kermanshah Province, Iran. At the 2006 census, its population was 159, in 32 families.

References 

Populated places in Gilan-e Gharb County